Ian Rogers (born October 17, 1976) is a Canadian writer of supernatural and horror fiction. His debut collection, Every House Is Haunted, was the winner of the 2013 ReLit Award in the short fiction category. A story from the collection, "The House on Ashley Avenue," was a nominee for the 2012 Shirley Jackson Award in the novelette category and is currently in development as a Netflix film produced by Sam Raimi.

Rogers is related to the late folk musician Stan Rogers and his brother Garnet Rogers.

Rogers is based in Peterborough, Ontario, and has worked as a webmaster and communications assistant for the city of Kawartha Lakes.

Bibliography

Collections
Every House Is Haunted (2012, ChiZine)
SuperNOIRtural Tales (2012, Burning Effigy Press)

Novellas
Deadstock (2011, Stonebunny Press)

Chapbooks
Temporary Monsters (2009, Burning Effigy Press, 40 pages)
The Ash Angels (2010, Burning Effigy Press, 40 pages )
Black-Eyed Kids (2011, Burning Effigy Press, 60 pages )

Short stories
Dates by original magazine or anthology publication.
 "The Tattletail" (2006), Dark Wisdom, Issue #9
 "The Black Tree" (2007), 55 Words
 "Everything Gets Bigger After Nuclear War" (2007), Fall and Rise, edited by Ahmed A. Khan
 "Charlotte's Frequency" (2007), Horror Library, Volume 2, edited by R.J. Cavender and Vincent VanAllen
 "Winter Hammock" (2007), Revelation, Issue #4:1
 "Twillingate" (2007), Salt, edited by Donna Burgess
 "Wood" (2007), Black Ink Horror, Issue #2
 "Autumn Burns" (2007), Writers Post Journal, September Issue
 "The Man from the Currents" (2007), Touched by Wonder, edited by Jackie Gamber
 "Relaxed Best" (2007), Not One of Us, Issue #38
 "Intervention" (2007), Shred of Evidence, ezine
 "Inheritor" (2008), Cemetery Dance, Issue #58
 "The Dark and the Young" (2008), Bound for Evil, edited by Tom English
 "The Nanny" (2008), Nossa Morte, Issue #3
 "The Kid Pool" (2008), The Written Word, Issue #13
 "Camp Zombie" (2008), Broken Pencil, Issue #40
 "Buffalo Money" (2008), Rope and Wire, ezine
 "Leaves Brown" (2008), Shades of Darkness, edited by Barbara Roden and Christopher Roden
 "Psong" (2009), Murky Depths, Issue #7
 "Vogo" (2009), Northern Haunts, edited by Tim Deal
 "The Luminous Veil" (2009), Bare Bone, Issue #11
 "Cabin D" (2010), Supernatural Tales, Issue #17
 "The Bottle" (2010), On Spec, Issue #82
 "The Candle" (2011), Shadows & Tall Trees, Issue #2
 "My Body" (2011), Chilling Tales, edited by Michael Kelly
 "Aces" (2012), Every House Is Haunted, original to collection
 "A Night in the Library with the Gods" (2012), Every House Is Haunted, original to collection
 "The Rifts Between Us" (2012), Every House Is Haunted, original to collection
 "The Cat" (2012), Every House Is Haunted, original to collection
 "Deleted Scenes" (2012), Every House Is Haunted, original to collection
 "Hunger" (2012), Every House Is Haunted, original to collection
 "The Secret Door" (2012), Every House Is Haunted, original to collection (only available in the limited edition hardcover)
 "The Brick" (2012), SuperNOIRtural Tales, original to collection
 "Midnight Blonde" (2012), Supernatural Tales, Issue #22
 "Out of the Blue" (2012), Fungi, edited by Silvia Moreno-Garcia and Orrin Grey
 "I Hate Needles" (2012), Strange World, edited by Andrew Burns, David Ward, and JP Fallavollita
 "False North" (2013), Shadows Edge, edited by Simon Strantzas
 "The Tour" (2013), free story posted online at everyhouseishaunted.com
 "Day Pass" (2013), Chilling Tales 2, edited by Michael Kelly

Anthology reprints
Below is a list of Rogers' short fiction which has been reprinted.
 "Camp Zombie" (2009), Can'tLit: Fearless Fiction from Broken Pencil Magazine, edited by Richard Rosenbaum
 "The Candle" (2012), Imaginarium 2012: The Best Canadian Speculative Writing, edited by Sandra Kasturi and Halli Villegas
 "Aces" (2013), Imaginarium 2013: The Best Canadian Speculative Writing, edited by Sandra Kasturi and Samantha Beiko
 "The House on Ashley Avenue" (2013), The Best Horror of the Year, Volume 5, edited by Ellen Datlow
 "Everything Gets Bigger After Nuclear War" (2013), Best Tales of the Apocalypse, edited by D.L. Snell

Awards

Won
 ReLit Award for Short Fiction (2013): Every House Is Haunted

Nominated
Shirley Jackson Award for Best Novelette (2012): "The House on Ashley Avenue"

References

External links
Official website

21st-century Canadian novelists
Canadian male novelists
Canadian male short story writers
Canadian horror writers
Writers from Toronto
People from Peterborough, Ontario
Living people
1976 births
21st-century Canadian short story writers
21st-century Canadian male writers